Rowena Evelyn Webster (born 27 December 1987), known as Rowie Webster, is an Australian water polo centre back and a two-time Olympian. She is one of three Australian players to play more than 300 international games for Australia. She attended Korowa Anglican Girls' School and Arizona State University and completed a Bachelor of Physical Education in Secondary Teaching. As youngster, she played Australian rules football after being heavily influenced by her older brother, James and was involved with surf lifesaving at a national level. She started playing water polo as a twelve-year-old. She has played for the Richmond Tigers, the Victorian State team, Arizona State University and professional sides in Greece and Russia. She has represented Australia as a member of Australia women's national water polo team on both the junior and senior level. Webster is a London Olympic bronze medalist, Junior World Champion, and has been rated in the top 3 players in the world two years in a row (2013, 2014). Rowie Webster is the current Australian Women's Water Polo Captain.

Personal
Webster was born on 27 December 1987 in Melbourne, Victoria. Her grandfather was Warwick Wathen, who competed in the Davis Cup as a junior. Her mother is a physiotherapist, her father a builder. Webster is the youngest of four children and her oldest sister Larissa Webster also played water polo for Australia.

She has five tattoos and loves how she can express herself through body image and art.

Webster attended Korowa Anglican Girls' School and used to play Australian rules football as a youngster. She has always been extremely competitive in basketball and surf life saving, and is the current vice-captain of the National women's water polo team. She took up surf lifesaving as a seven-year-old at the Anglesea Surf life saving club. She studied for her Victorian Certificate of Education in 2005. She spent a year studying at Arizona State University on scholarship where she studied physical education secondary teaching and completed her degree here in Melbourne at Deakin University. She is currently on scholarship at the Victorian Institute of Sport.  She completed a Bachelor of physical education in secondary teaching, and is living in Balwyn North, Victoria. Rowie has played in the Greek league and the Russian League and has made her mark on the international scene in women's water polo. 

Her Stingers teammates say she is a fierce competitor and loves to win. She has a huge Nike shoe collection and adds to it on every international tour. She is openly lesbian.

Water polo

Webster started playing water polo as a ten-year-old, and more seriously as a twelve-year-old in Melbourne, Australia acting as a fill-in for her older sister's team at that age.  In 2010 and 2011, she had a water polo scholarship from the Victorian Institute of Sport.  She prefers to wear cap number seven and is a utility player who can be found in the centre back position.  She has scars on her back from opposition players biting her there during games.  She feels a need to wear a mouth guard during every game she plays. Her water polo club is the Richmond Tigers. In 2003, she played for the club at State League Level 1, the highest ability league open to players of all ages. She first represented the state of Victoria in 2000. In 2003, she was Victorian team captain. In 2003, she woke up at "4.40 am twice a week for training and swimming three afternoons a week". In 2005, she was putting in "three gym sessions, three swimming drills, [and] six rounds of water polo practice" a week. That year, she represented the state of Victoria at the Australian Water Polo Championships. She also represented the state in 2005 at the National Schoolgirls Water Polo Competition held Noosa, Queensland.

Club water polo
Webster currently plays for the Balmain Togers National Team and captains the side. She played for the Victorian Tigers of the National Water Polo League in 2004 during the team's first year of existence. She also played for the team in 2005, 2007, 2009, 2010, 2011 and 2012.

University water polo
Webster attended Arizona State in Tempe, Arizona on a water polo scholarship when she was an eighteen-year-old but only spent a year with the team.

Professional water polo
As a nineteen-year-old, Webster played for a professional team in Greece for five months in 2008. While playing in Greece, she had to deal with a culture of water polo that tolerated biting of other players during games. She left Greece to concentrate on making Australia's national team for the Olympics.

Junior national team
Webster has represented Australia at the junior national level and won the World Championships at the FINA World Champions in Portugal 2007. She was a member of the junior team for 3 consecutive years.

Senior national team

Webster is the captain and a member of the Australia women's national water polo team and has played over 300 games for Australia. She was a member of the London Olympic Team that won bronze in 2012 and has been an integral part of the 2013 World Championships team that won silver and the 2014 World Cup team that also won silver. Webster was the highest goal scorer for Team Australia at the 2012 London Olympics.  Rowie holds the Australian record for most goals in a National League Season (99 goals). She has also played over 250 games in the league.

Webster was a member of the Australian Stingrays squad that competed at the Tokyo 2020 Olympics. The head coach was Predrag Mihailović. Webster was captain. By finishing second in their pool, the Aussie Stingers went through to the quarterfinals. They were beaten 8-9 by Russia and therefore did not compete for an Olympic medal. Australia at the 2020 Summer Olympics details the team's performance in depth.

See also
 Australia women's Olympic water polo team records and statistics
 List of Olympic medalists in water polo (women)
 List of women's Olympic water polo tournament top goalscorers
 List of World Aquatics Championships medalists in water polo

References

External links

 

1987 births
Living people
Australian female water polo players
Sportswomen from Victoria (Australia)
Arizona State Sun Devils women's water polo players
Water polo players at the 2012 Summer Olympics
Olympic water polo players of Australia
Olympic medalists in water polo
Olympic bronze medalists for Australia
Sportspeople from Melbourne
Victorian Institute of Sport alumni
Medalists at the 2012 Summer Olympics
World Aquatics Championships medalists in water polo
Water polo players at the 2016 Summer Olympics
Deakin University alumni
Water polo players at the 2020 Summer Olympics
Australian LGBT sportspeople
People from Balwyn, Victoria
Lesbian sportswomen